Ugly Delicious is a non-fiction original series on Netflix combining travel, cooking, and history. Each episode highlights one dish or concept, and explores how it is made in different regions and how it evolves.

The first season premiered on February 23, 2018 with host David Chang. On November 22, 2018, it was renewed for a second season, which premiered on March 6, 2020. The second season contained only half as many episodes as the first, likely due to Chang's increasingly busy schedule and the birth of his first child.

Plot 

Each episode examines the cultural, sociological, and culinary history of a specific popular food. Chang challenges and explores the attitudes in each dish's lore. Mike Hale wrote in his review for The New York Times that Ugly Delicious is "an extended television essay, in the form of free-associative, globe-trotting conversations about food and culture."

Episodes

Season 1 (2018)

Season 2 (2020)

Reception 
Critical reviews have mostly been positive. Review aggregator Rotten Tomatoes reported an approval rating of 100% based on 21 reviews, with an average rating of 8.33/10 for the first season. The website's critical consensus states, "Ugly Delicious injects new life into the food documentary by dispensing with culinary pretensions and celebrating a vibrant spectrum of dishes that are sure to whet audience appetites." Metacritic gave the series a weighted average score of 77 out of 100 based on 5 reviews, indicating "generally favorable reviews".

Greg Morabito of Eater called the series' first season "maddeningly good" claiming that it, "raises the bar for food/travel shows." Jen Chaney of Vulture praised the show's first season for raising important cultural issues and taking "a highly egalitarian approach to cuisine."

For the second season, review aggregator Rotten Tomatoes reported an approval rating of 100% based on 5 reviews, with an average rating of 7/10.

Accolades

See also 

 Dark cuisine or hei an liao li

References

External links
 Ugly Delicious official website on Netflix
 
 

2018 American television series debuts
2020 American television series endings
2010s American documentary television series
2020s American documentary television series
Food and drink television series
English-language Netflix original programming
Netflix original documentary television series